The 2012–13 Cypriot Fourth Division was the 28th season of the Cypriot fourth-level football league. MEAP Nisou won their 2nd title.

Format
Fourteen teams participated in the 2012–13 Cypriot Fourth Division. All teams played against each other twice, once at their home and once away. The team with the most points at the end of the season crowned champions. The first four teams were promoted to the 2013–14 Cypriot Third Division and the last two teams were relegated to regional leagues.

Point system
Teams received three points for a win, one point for a draw and zero points for a loss.

Changes from previous season
Teams promoted to 2012–13 Cypriot Third Division
 Digenis Oroklinis
 Karmiotissa Pano Polemidion
 Ethnikos Latsion FC

Teams relegated from 2011–12 Cypriot Third Division
 Anagennisi Germasogeias1
 POL/AE Maroni2

1Withdrew from the 2012–13 Cypriot Fourth Division during the summer, before the start of the season.
2Withdrew after 14th round of 2011–12 Cypriot Third Division for financial reasons. Not participated in 2012–13 Cypriot Fourth Division.

Teams promoted from regional leagues
 AEN Ayiou Georgiou Vrysoullon-Acheritou
 ASPIS Pylas
 Enosi Neon Ypsona
 Amathus Ayiou Tychona

Teams relegated to regional leagues
 Kedros Ayia Marina Skylloura
 AEK Kythreas
 AEK Korakou

Notes:
Livadiakos/Salamina Livadion also secured participation in the 2012–13 Cypriot Fourth Division. The team secured their participation in the 2011–12 Cypriot Fourth Division through the amateur divisions. However, Cyprus Football Association decided that the team did not meet basic requirements for the registering as a member of the federation. After an extraordinary general meeting it was decided that the team was eventually able to join the Cyprus Football Association. But, because the 2011–12 Cypriot Fourth Division had already began, it was decided that the team would book a place to the 2012–13 Cypriot Fourth Division.

Stadia and locations

League standings

Results

See also
 Cypriot Fourth Division
 2012–13 Cypriot First Division
 2012–13 Cypriot Cup for lower divisions
 Cypriot football league system

Sources
 

Cypriot Fourth Division seasons
Cyprus
2012–13 in Cypriot football